Shady Glen Road Stone Arch Bridge, also known as Elliotts' Bridge, is a historic stone arch bridge located at Cornwallville in Greene County, New York. It was constructed in 1886 and is a single span, dry laid limestone bridge with a round arch.  It spans an unnamed tributary of Catskill Creek.

It was built by Jeremiah Cunningham.

It was listed on the National Register of Historic Places in 2008.

References

Road bridges on the National Register of Historic Places in New York (state)
Bridges completed in 1886
Bridges in Greene County, New York
National Register of Historic Places in Greene County, New York
Stone arch bridges in the United States